Valery Tereshchenko may refer to:
 Valery Tereshchenko (diplomat)
 Valery Tereshchenko (academic)